Josie Walker is a Northern Irish actress.

Career

Musicals
 The Phantom of the Opera (Manchester, 1992), (London, 1996)
 Cats (English tour, 1995)
 The Beautiful Game (London, 2000) - Laurence Olivier Award for Best Actress in a Musical nominee
 Evita (New Zealand tour, 2004)
  Assassins  (Sheffield, 2006)
 Side by Side by Sondheim (London, 2007)
 Matilda the Musical (Stratford, 2010; London, 2011)
 Everybody's Talking About Jamie (London, 2017; Laurence Olivier Award for Best Actress in a Musical nominee).

Theatre
She has also starred in theatre, including War Horse at the Royal National Theatre in 2012.

Other plays at the National include: The Silver Tassie, 3 Winters, Husbands and Sons, The Plough and the Stars, and most recently The Ocean at the End of the Lane, for which she was nominated for Best Actress in a supporting role 2020 Olivier Awards.

Television 
Walker's television work includes: The Bill, EastEnders, Holby, Waterloo Road, Blessed, Psychoville Halloween Special, Call the Midwife, and most recently, Vera (S9:E4, 2019), and White House Farm Murders.

References

External links 
 

Actresses from Belfast
1970 births
Living people
Stage actresses from Northern Ireland
20th-century actresses from Northern Ireland
21st-century actresses from Northern Ireland
Alumni of the Guildhall School of Music and Drama